The Synod of New South Wales and the ACT is a regional council of the Uniting Church in Australia having responsibility for the congregations and presbyteries in New South Wales and the Australian Capital Territory. From its creation in 1977 until 29 March 2008, the Synod had the shorter title of Synod of New South Wales.

The current (28th) Moderator (chairperson) of the Synod is Rev. Simon Hansford. He will be succeeded by Rev. Faaimata (Mata) Havea Hiliau at the end of his term in 2023.

Presbyteries
There are 13 presbyteries in the Synod of New South Wales and the ACT. These are regional councils with responsibility for oversight of congregations in their area, plus the Korean Presbytery.
Canberra Region Presbytery
Far North Coast Presbytery
Georges River Presbytery
Illawarra Presbytery
Korean Presbytery
Macquarie Darling Presbytery
Mid North Coast Presbytery
New England North West Presbytery
Parramatta Nepean Presbytery
Riverina Presbytery
Sydney Central Coast Presbytery
Sydney Presbytery
The Hunter Presbytery

The regional council of the Uniting Aboriginal and Islander Christian Congress (UAICC) also functions similarly to a presbytery.

Moderators

References

External links 
 

Uniting Church in Australia
Christianity in New South Wales